Intelsat III F-7 was an American communications satellite owned by Intelsat. The satellite had an estimated useful life of 5 years.

Design 
The seventh of eight Intelsat III satellites to be launched, Intelsat III F-7 was built by TRW. It was a  spacecraft equipped with two transponders to be powered by body-mounted solar cells generating 183 watts of power. It had a design life of five years and carried an SVM-2 apogee motor for propulsion.

Launch 
Intelsat III F-7 was launched by a Delta M rocket, flying from Launch Complex 17A at the Cape Canaveral Air Force Station.

See also

 1970 in spaceflight

References

Intelsat satellites
Spacecraft launched in 1970
1970 in spaceflight
Satellite launch failures